East Glacier may refer to:
 East Glacier Park Village, Montana, a census-designated place (CDP) in Glacier County, Montana, United States.
 East Glacier Ranger Station Historic District
 East Glacier Park (Amtrak station), a seasonal station stop for the Amtrak Empire Builder in East Glacier Park, Montana.